Fred Young may refer to:
 Fred Young (director) (1900–1977), Chinese-Indonesian filmmaker
 Fred Young (Ohio politician) (1932–2006), member of the Ohio House of Representatives
 Fred Young (Ontario politician) (1907–1993), Canadian politician
 Fred A. Young (1904–1973), New York politician and judge
 Fred E. Young (1919–2005), American biblical scholar
 Fred Young, better known as Fred Begay (1932–2013), Native American nuclear physicist
 Fred Young (businessman), American businessman
 Fred Young (New Zealand politician) (1888–1962), New Zealand hotel employee and manager, trade unionist, soldier and politician
 James Fred Young, seventh president of Elon University

See also
Frederick Young (disambiguation)